Hazen's Notch State Park is a 307-acre state park in the town of Westfield, Vermont, in Orleans County. The park features the height of land of Hazen's Notch, a mountain pass in the northern Green Mountains of Vermont. It is located on Vermont Route 58.

Activities in the undeveloped park include hunting, hiking, bird watching, and snowshoeing. The Long Trail passes through sections of the park.

The park includes the 273-acre Hazen's Notch Natural Area, which features cliffs of serpentine rock that support rare alpine and serpentine-adapted plant species. Peregrine falcons have also nested here historically. The Long Trail passes through the Natural Area. The Long Range Management Plan emphasizes protection of natural resources while allowing for undeveloped recreation. The plan includes a detailed geological, natural, cultural and recreational history of Hazen's Notch.

References

External links
Official website
Hazen's Notch Association
U.S. Geological Survey Map at the U.S. Geological Survey Map Website. Retrieved January 6th, 2022.

State parks of Vermont
Protected areas of Orleans County, Vermont
Westfield, Vermont